Extreme Tennis is a video game developed and published by Head Games Publishing for Windows in 1998.

Reception

The game received unfavorable reviews according to the review aggregation website GameRankings.

References

External links
 

1998 video games
Tennis video games
Video games developed in the United States
Windows games
Windows-only games